Mihael Mikić (born 6 January 1980) is a Croatian former professional footballer who played as a right midfielder. He is currently working as an assistant manager of the Maribor. 

He most commonly played as a right winger or right-back, but was known as a quite effective forward in the beginnings of his career.

Club career

Mikić was born in Zagreb and started to play football at the club NK Bistra when he was seven years old. At the age of 13, he moved to Inker Zaprešić and started his professional career at the club already at the age of 16. He left Inker after his first professional season and went on to sign with Dinamo Zagreb, where he became a regular by the time he turned 19.

He was still only 18 years old when he went on to make three appearances for Dinamo Zagreb in the UEFA Champions League group stage in the autumn of 1998, starting in two matches and becoming notable for scoring the club's first goal in the UEFA Champions League when he opened the scoring in the 7th minute of Dinamo's fourth group match, against Porto at home in Zagreb. Dinamo won the match 3–1 and went on to win 1–0 against Ajax Amsterdam away and draw 1–1 against Olympiacos at home, but failed to advance to the quarterfinals after finishing second in their group. Mikić appeared in all of Dinamo's three home matches, playing as a striker.

He also played with Dinamo Zagreb in the UEFA Champions League in the following year and made five appearances in six group matches, but was a starting player only once. He scored one goal in Dinamo's final group match, away against Olympique de Marseille, that ended in a 2–2 draw. Dinamo was eliminated from the competition after finishing last out of four teams in their group.

Mikić continued to play for Dinamo Zagreb until 2004 and then he left the club after seven seasons for German Bundesliga side 1. FC Kaiserslautern. In his first season in Germany, he made only six Bundesliga appearances for Kaiserslautern and was not a regular in the first part of the 2005–06 season either, making only four appearances in the league, but then he became a regular after the winter break and collected a total of 20 Bundesliga appearances until the end of the season. He did not manage to score any goals in a total of 29 competitive appearances for Kaiserslautern and left the club in June 2006, shortly after they were relegated to the 2. Bundesliga with a 16th-place finish in the first division.

In July 2006, he came back to Croatia by signing with Rijeka and made his competitive debut for the club on 13 July 2006 in their first-leg first-round UEFA Cup qualifier against Cypriot club Omonia Nicosia. Omonia eliminated Rijeka from the competition in the second leg by winning 4–3 on aggregate. Mikić's domestic league debut for Rijeka came on 30 July 2006 in the club's opening match of the 2006–07 season, where they celebrated a 4–3 away victory against Cibalia.

In January 2007, Mikić left Rijeka after making only 14 domestic league appearances for the club and returned to his former club Dinamo Zagreb, making his domestic league debut in their 2–1 victory in derby against Hajduk Split on 24 February 2007.

On 25 December 2008, it was announced that Mikić moved to J. League side Sanfrecce Hiroshima.

International career
Mikić could not crack the Croatian national A-team, but he had a fairly successful international career at youth level with the Croatian national under-19 and under-21 teams.

He debuted for the Croatian under-19 team on 3 November 1997 against Northern Ireland in their qualifying campaign for the 1998 European Under-18 Championship and subsequently made another two appearances for the team in the qualifying, scoring once. In July 1998, he was seen by many as the best player of the Croatian team at the European Under-18 Championship finals in Cyprus, where he scored three goals in four matches and helped the team to reach the third place after beating Portugal on penalty shootout. After the tournament, he made another four appearances and scored one goal for the team in their qualifying campaign for the 1999 European Under-18 Championship.

Mikić won his last international cap for the Croatian under-19 team on 24 March 1999 and went to make his debut for the country's under-21 team in their opening match of the 1999 World Youth Championship in Nigeria, against Ghana on 4 April 1999. He appeared in all four matches played by the Croatian team at the tournament before they were eliminated by Brazil in the round of 16. Until the end of the year 1999, he made five appearances and scored three goals for the Croatian under-21 team in their qualifying campaign for the 2000 European Under-21 Championship and subsequently also appeared in all three group matches at the final tournament in Slovakia, where Croatia was eliminated in the group stage. He continued to play for the Croatian under-21 team until November 2001, making six appearances and scoring three goals in their qualifying campaign for the 2002 European Under-21 Championship.

Career statistics

Honours
Dinamo Zagreb
Prva HNL: 1997–98, 1998–99, 1999–2000, 2002–03, 2006–07, 2007–08
 Croatian Cup: 1997–98, 2000–01, 2001–02, 2006–07, 2007–08
 Croatian Super Cup: 2002, 2003

Sanfrecce Hiroshima
 J. League Division 1: 2012, 2013, 2015
 Japanese Super Cup: 2013, 2014, 2016

References

External links

Mihael Mikić national team appearances at the Croatian Football Federation official website 

1980 births
Living people
Footballers from Zagreb
Association football midfielders
Croatian footballers
Croatia youth international footballers
Croatia under-21 international footballers
NK Inter Zaprešić players
GNK Dinamo Zagreb players
1. FC Kaiserslautern players
HNK Rijeka players
Sanfrecce Hiroshima players
Shonan Bellmare players
Croatian Football League players
Bundesliga players
J1 League players
Croatian expatriate footballers
Expatriate footballers in Germany
Croatian expatriate sportspeople in Germany
Expatriate footballers in Japan
Croatian expatriate sportspeople in Japan
GNK Dinamo Zagreb non-playing staff
Croatian expatriate sportspeople in Slovenia